Thomas Zephaniah Kentish (born 15 December 1957) is a former Dominican cricketer who played for the Windward Islands in West Indian domestic cricket. He was a right-arm off spin bowler.

Playing career
Born and raised in Goodwill, a suburb of Roseau, Kentish made his first-class debut for the Windwards in January 1977, in what was then the annual fixture against the Leeward Islands. He did not make his Shell Shield debut for the team until the 1981–82 season, but after that remained a regular in the team throughout the 1980s and into the early 1990s. Kentish took his maiden first-class five-wicket haul in only his second Shell Shield match, returning figures of 6/69 against Barbados. He took another two five-wicket hauls during the 1984–85 season, taking 20 wickets from five matches to finish as his team's leading wicket-taker (and seventh in the overall competition). The previous season, he had been runner-up to Stanley Hinds in the Windwards' wicket-taking. Kentish played his last matches for the Windward Islands during the 1991–92 season, aged 34. In his final limited-overs fixture, against Guyana, he took a career-best 4/12 from 7.4 overs, which saw him named man of the match.

Legacy
On 24 June 2022, the East stand at Windsor Park was renamed in Kentish's honour.

References

External links
Player profile and statistics at CricketArchive
Player profile and statistics at ESPNcricinfo

1957 births
Living people
Dominica cricketers
Windward Islands cricketers
People from Saint George Parish, Dominica